Barney Miller is an American situation comedy television series set in a New York City Police Department police station in Greenwich Village. The series originally was broadcast from January 23, 1975, to May 20, 1982, on ABC. It was created by Danny Arnold and Theodore J. Flicker. Noam Pitlik directed the majority of the episodes.

Series overview

Episodes

Pilot (1974)
The Life and Times of Captain Barney Miller, aired on August 22, 1974 as part of an ABC summer anthology series, Just for Laughs.

Season 1 (1975)

Season 2 (1975–76)

Season 3 (1976–77)

Season 4 (1977–78)

Season 5 (1978–79)

Season 6 (1979–80)

Season 7 (1980–81)

Season 8 (1981–82)

References

Lists of American sitcom episodes
Episodes